École Polytechnique de l'Université d'Orléans is a French engineering school located in Orléans and more precisely in the district of Orléans-la-source.
It is accredited by the French Commission des titres d'ingénieur (CTI) and the European Network for Accreditation of Engineering Education (EUR-ACE). Since 15 September 2009, Polytech Orléans is a member of the Conférence des Grandes Écoles.

Presentation 
Polytech Orléans is part of the national engineering schools Polytech, it results of the fusion of two institutes, both parts of the University of Orléans: the École Supérieure de l'Énergie et des Matériaux – ESEM (School of Engineering Materials and Energies) and the École Supérieure de Procédés Électroniques et Optiques – ESPEO (School of Electronics and Optics). Polytech'Orléans was born in 2002.

The school is located on the European campus of the University of Orléans.

Courses 
Polytech Orléans offers a five-year course: a preparatory course (2 years) aimed to prepare students to follow an engineering course, it is mainly based on the study of fundamental science, and an engineering course (3 years) :
 ecotechnology engineering in electronics and optics
 mechanical and energy engineering
 civil engineering / environment
 production management (dual education system)
 Home automation engineering (dual education system)

Graduate students are usually hired in the automotive industry, environment, aeronautics, embedded systems, energetics or signal processing. Graduate students are on average hired after one month.

References 

University of Orléans